The Colored Citizen was the first African American newspaper published in Mississippi. It was founded by Henry Mayson in 1867, and it probably died by 1868. According to Mayson, the paper sought racial equality and the elimination of racial discrimination, including in school funding schemes. No surviving copies of the paper have been located.

Publication and demise 
The Colored Citizen was founded in 1867 by Henry Mayson, a leader for the black community in and around the urban city of Vicksburg, Mississippi. It was the first African American newspaper in the state, and it was commercially viable. Its intended publication date was May 11, 1867; Mayson published a prospectus in the Vicksburg Herald calling for equal educational opportunities for black and white children, the right for black men to hold public office, and the eradication of legally-enforced racial discrimination. A note attached to the prospectus in the Daily Clarion says it will be published "by an intelligent colored man" in opposition to black political "antagonism". 

The precise contents of the Colored Citizen are unknown since no surviving copies have been located, but the paper likely contained four pages, held advertisements, sold annual subscriptions for between $1 and $2, and may have been published weekly. It was Republican in political orientation. The paper likely died within a few months of its founding, though the precise dates of its dissolution are not known. 

It was succeeded by the Citizen of Canton in 1869 and the Field Hand of Jackson around 1870. An unrelated paper also called the Colored Citizen was published in Jackson, founded in 1868. That paper was established by reverend James D. Lynch and politician James J. Spelman.

Notes and references

Notes

Citations

Bibliography

 
 
 
 
 
 

 

1867 establishments in Mississippi
African-American history of Mississippi
Defunct African-American newspapers
Defunct newspapers published in Mississippi
Newspapers established in 1867